Sphingobacterium is a genus in the family Sphingobacteriaceae. The genus Sphingobacterium is characterized by the high concentrations of sphingophospholipids as lipid components.

Species

S. alimentarium
S. anhuiense
S. arenae
S. bambusae
S. caeni
S. canadense
S. changzhouense
S. chuzhouense 
S. cibi 
S. cladoniae
S. composti
S. daejeonense
S. detergens
S. faecium
S. ginsenosidimutans
S. gobiense
S. griseoflavum
S. hotanense 
S. jejuense  
S. kitahiroshimense
S. kyonggiense 
S. lactis
S. mizutaii 
S. mucilaginosum
S. multivorum
S. nematocida 
S. pakistanense
S. paludis
S. populi
S. psychroaquaticum
S. shayense
S. siyangense
S. spiritivorum
S. suaedae
S. thalpophilum
S. thermophilum
S. wenxiniae
S. yanglingense
S. zeae

References

Sphingobacteriia
Bacteria genera